Saint James is a civil parish in Charlotte County, New Brunswick, Canada, located north of St. Stephen. It comprises one local service district (LSD) and part of a second, both of which are members of the Southwest New Brunswick Service Commission (SNBSC).

The Census subdivision of the same name shares the parish's borders.

Origin of name
Historian William Francis Ganong believed the name suggested by other Saint names in the area.

Five of the original six mainland parishes of Charlotte County used names of major saints recognised by the Church of England: Andrew (Scotland), David (Wales), George (England), Patrick (Ireland), and Stephen, and Saint James was the first new mainland parish to be erected in the county.

History
Saint James was erected in 1823 from Saint Stephen Parish and unassigned lands to the north of Saint Stephen and Saint David Parish; the northern line of Saint Stephen had run above Gleason Point, Oak Hill, and DeWolfe.

Boundaries
Saint James Parish is bounded:

 on the north by the York County line;
 on the east by a line beginning about 4.7 kilometres east of the Digdeguash River, on the prolongation of the eastern line of the Cape Ann Association, which runs along the rear line of grants on the eastern side of Board Road, then running south to the Digdeguash River;
 on the southeast and south by a line running along the Cape Ann Association grant, westerly to a point about 1.2 kilometres west of the junction of Richardson Road and Route 755 and about 450 metres north of Scott Road, then in 1.5-kilometre steps southerly, westerly, southerly, and westerly to the Dennis Stream, then downstream through Moores Mills Lake to a point about 600 metres north of the kink in Murphy Road, on the prolongation of the southern line of two grants to James Maxwell, then westerly along the prolongation, the Maxwell grants, passing about 300 metres north of the junction of Route 745 and Route 3, and along the prolongation to a point about 3 kilometres past Route 740, on the corner of the tier of grants between Route 740 and Route 735, then southerly and southeasterly along the tier, crossing Route 735, to a point about 550 metres north of Kendricks Lake, on the southeastern line of a grant to John McCauly, then southwesterly along the McCauly grant and its prolongation to the St. Croix River;
 on the west by the St. Croix River.

Local service districts
Both LSDs assess for only the basic LSD services of fire protection, police services, land use planning, emergency measures, and dog control.

Saint James Parish
The local service district of the parish of Saint James originally comprised the entire parish.

The LSD was established in 1969 to assess for community services, in this case to provide ambulance service after local funeral homes ceased doing so. Fire protection was added in 1970.

The taxing authority is 520.00 Saint James.

Western Charlotte
Western Charlotte comprises an area along the St. Croix River, running east from the mouth of Canoose Stream, then south along Green Brown Brook until it strikes the rear line of grants along the eastern side of the Basswood Ridge Road until it crosses Robinson Cross Road, southwesterly until it strikes the rear line of grants along Route 740, then southerly to the parish line, following the parish line to the western line of grants along Route 740, then running southerly along grant lines to St. Stephen, westerly along the St. Stephen limits to the western end of the town, then northwesterly along the rear line of grants west of Barter Settlement Road  before turning southwesterly to strike the Mohannes Stream about midway between the two crossings of the Burnt Hill Road, upstream to about midway between the Chandler Road and the parish line, turning southwesterly to the rear line of grants along Route 725, then northwesterly to the parish line and southwest to the St. Croix.

The LSD was established in 1988 to add first aid and ambulance services.

The taxing authority is 528.00 Western Charlotte.

Communities
Communities at least partly within the parish.

 Andersonville
 Baillie
 Barber Dam
 Basswood Ridge
 Beaconsfield
 Canoose
 DeWolfe
 Gleason Road
 Lawrence Station
 Lower Little Ridge
 Lynnfield
 Meredith Settlement
 Moores Mills
 Oak Hill
 Pomeroy Ridge
 Scotch Ridge
 Upper Little Ridge
 Watt Junction
 Weeks Road

Bodies of water
Bodies of water at least partly within the parish.

 Digdeguash River
 St. Croix River
 Grand Falls Flowage
 Woodland Flowage
 Canoose Stream
 Canoose Flowage
 Upper Canoose Flowage
 Dennis Stream
 Mohannes Stream
 Loon Bay
 Black Water Lake
 Cranberry Lake
 King Brook Lake
 Middle Lake
 Moores Mills Lake
 Mud Lake
 Potters Lake

Islands
Islands at least partly within the parish.

 Dog Islands
 Grassy Islands
 Gravel Island
 Green Island
 Horse Island
 King Brook Islands

Other notable places
Parks, historic sites, and other noteworthy places at least partly within the parish.
 Andersonville Protected Natural Area
 Baillie Settlement Protected Natural Area
 Canoose Flowage Protected Natural Area
 Clark Point Protected Natural Area
 Cowlily Pond Brook Protected Natural Area
 Saint Croix Provincial Park
 St. Croix River Islands Protected Natural Area

Demographics

Population

Language

Access Routes
Highways and numbered routes that run through the parish, including external routes that start or finish at the parish limits:

Highways

Principal Routes

Secondary Routes:
None

External Routes:
None

See also
List of parishes in New Brunswick

Notes

References

External links
 Western Charlotte Local Service District

Local service districts of Charlotte County, New Brunswick
Parishes of Charlotte County, New Brunswick